Mahoning Creek is a tributary of the Susquehanna River in Columbia County and Montour County, in Pennsylvania, in the United States. Its tributaries include Kase Run, Mauses Creek, and Sechler Run. Mahoning Creek is designated as a Trout-Stocking Fishery and a Migratory Fishery for part of its length and as a Warmwater Fishery and a Migratory Fishery for the remainder.

Mahoning Creek is considered by the Pennsylvania Department of Environmental Protection to be impaired by siltation. The main rock formations in the watershed include the Trimmers Rock Formation, the Clinton Group, the Catskill Formation, the Hamilton Group, the Bloomsburg and Mifflintown Formation, the Onondaga and Old Port Formation, and the Wills Creek Formation. The main soils include the Berks-Weikert-Alvira series, the Chenango-Pope-Holly series, the Clymer-Buchanan-Norwich series, and the Leck Kill-Meckesville-Calvin series. Most of the watershed is forested or agricultural land, but there is some developed land.

There was historically a village of the Delaware tribe near the mouth of Mahoning Creek. The first people of European descent arrived in the area in the 1760s and 1770s. Various mills were constructed on it in the 1700s and 1800s. Numerous bridges have also been constructed across the creek. Part of the creek is in the Montour Ridge Landscape Corridor.

Course 

Mahoning Creek begins in a valley in Madison Township, Columbia County. It flows south for a short distance before turning west-southwest for several tenths of a mile, exiting Columbia County.

Upon exiting Columbia County, Mahoning Creek enters West Hemlock Township, Montour County. It flows south-southwest alongside Pennsylvania Route 642 for a few miles before crossing Pennsylvania Route 642 and entering Derry Township. The creek then turns south for a few miles and enters Valley Township. In Valley Township, it continues flowing south in its valley and crosses Pennsylvania Route 642 before continuing south. The creek eventually enters a much broader valley and flows away from Pennsylvania Route 642. After several tenths of a mile, it crosses Interstate 80 and receives Kase Run, its first named tributary, from the left. The creek then meanders west for several tenths of a mile and then turns southwest, flowing alongside Pennsylvania Route 642 again. Not far from Mausdale, Mahoning Creek crosses Pennsylvania Route 642 and Pennsylvania Route 54 and receives the tributary Mauses Creek from the right. The creek then turns southeast and begins flowing alongside Pennsylvania Route 54 into Mahoning Township and through a water gap in Montour Ridge. It enters Danville and leaves behind the water gap, turning south-southwest and crossing US Route 11. After a few tenths of a mile, the creek receives Sechler Run, its last named tributary, from the left, and turns west-northwest. After several tenths of a mile, it exits Danville and enters Mahoning Township briefly before turning sharply southeast and reentering Danville. After a short distance, the creek reaches its confluence with the Susquehanna River.

Tributaries 
Mahoning Creek has three named tributaries, which are known as Kase Run, Mauses Creek, and Sechler Run. The creek also has a number of unnamed tributaries. There are a total of 92 stream miles in the watershed of the creek. 90 of these stream miles are in Montour County and the other two stream miles are in Columbia County.

Hydrology

There is significant stormwater flow and sedimentation in Mahoning Creek, as well as agricultural and urban runoff. However, the creek is less environmentally damaged than the nearby Chillisquaque Creek. Mahoning Creek is considered by the Pennsylvania Department of Environmental Protection to be impaired downstream of Kase Run, part of which is also impaired. Additionally, the tributary Mauses Creek is considered to be impaired, as are the upper reaches of the tributary Sechler Run. The cause of the impairment of Mahoning Creek is siltation and the source is agriculture and urban runoff/storm sewers. Sections of all three of its named tributaries are impaired, with the cause being siltation and the source being agriculture.

Wetlands contribute  of phosphorus to the creek daily.

On average,  of precipitation fall in the watershed of Mahoning Creek each year.

Geology and geography 

The highest parts of the watershed are in its eastern section. The watershed of Mahoning Creek is in the ridge and valley physiographic region's Appalachian Mountain Section.

In the upland parts of the watershed of Mahoning Creek, 95 percent of the rock is sedimentary rock, mainly of the Trimmers Rock Formation, the Clinton Group, the Catskill Formation, the Hamilton Group, the Bloomsburg and Mifflintown Formation, the Onondaga and Old Port Formation, and the Wills Creek Formation. The Catskill Formation occurs in a large area in the northeastern part of the watershed and the Trimmers Rock Formation occurs in the rest of the northern part of the watershed and in the southernmost part of the watershed. The Hamilton Group is to the south of the northern area of the Trimmers Rock Formation and to the north of the southern area of the formation. The Onondaga and Old Port Formation occurs south of the Hamilton Group and near Sechler Run, as does the Keyser and Tonoloway Formation. The Wills Creek Formation is found in the central part of the watershed, as is the Bloomsburg and Mifflintown Formation. The Clinton Group occurs south of these formations and south of the Clinton Group is more of the aforementioned formations.

50 percent of the rock in the Mahoning Creek watershed is of the Trimmers Rock Formation, 15 percent is of the Clinton Group, and 10 percent is of the Hamilton Group. The Bloomsburg and Mifflintown Formation occupies 8 percent of the watershed. The Keyser and Tonoloway Formation, the Wills Creek Formation, and the Catskill Formation each occupy 5 percent, while the Onondaga and Old Port Formation makes up 2 percent.

The most common soil series in the watershed of Mahoning Creek is the Berks-Weikert-Alvira series, a shaly silt loam. Other soil series in the watershed include the Chenango-Pope-Holly series, the Clymer-Buchanan-Norwich series, and the Leck Kill-Meckesville-Calvin series. The Chenango-Pope-Holly series is found in the lower reaches of the watershed, the Leck Kill-Minersville-Calvin series is found in the northwestern part of it, and the Clymer-Buchanan-Norwich series occurs in the southwestern part of the watershed. All other parts of it are occupied by the Berks-Weikert-Alvira series.

The Berks-Weikert-Alvira makes up 90 percent of the soil in the Mahoning Creek watershed. 5 percent is of the Leck Kill-Meckesville-Calvin series, 3 percent is of the Clymer-Buchanan-Norwich, and 2 percent is of the Chenango-Pope-Holly series.

Mahoning Creek cuts through Montour Ridge. It has a forested floodplain in Mahoning Township. Parts of the creek experience stream bank erosion.

Watershed 

It primarily drains the central portion of Montour County and is almost entirely in Montour County. However, a small portion of the creek's watershed lies in the neighboring Columbia County. The watershed makes up 30 percent of the area of Montour County. Mahoning Creek drains the area in the vicinity of Danville. The mouth of the creek is in the United States Geological Survey quadrangle of Riverside. However, its source is in the quadrangle of Millville. It also passes through the quadrangle of Danville.

47.15 percent of the watershed of Mahoning Creek consists of forested land. 36.47 percent of the watershed is agricultural land and 16.38 percent is developed land. Most of the developed land is classified as "low-intensity development", but some is classified as "high-intensity development". There are 7.4 acres of wetlands in the watershed.

Much of the land near the mouth of Mahoning Creek is developed. A strip of land crossing the watershed in its central section is also developed. The southernmost part of the watershed is largely agricultural land. North of this is an area of mostly forested land and the central part of the watershed is mostly agricultural land. The northern part includes both forested and agricultural land. The fastest development in Montour County is occurring in the watershed of the creek.

Interstate 80 runs in an east-west direction through the watershed of Mahoning Creek. There are also a number of township roads near the creek and its tributaries. Pennsylvania Route 54, Pennsylvania Route 642, and US Route 11 are in the watershed as well.

History and etymology 
Mahoning Creek was entered into the Geographic Names Information System on August 2, 1979. Its identifier in the Geographic Names Information System is 1192876. The word "mahoning" is a Native American word for "at the lick".

There used to be a village of Delaware Indians at the mouth of Mahoning Creek. One of the first buildings in Danville, a gristmill built by George Montgomery's father, was built on Mahoning Creek. A tract of 180 acres in Danville, including an area along the creek, was once owned by the Penn family. Phillip Maus was among the first settlers in Valley Township, Montour County, having settled there in 1769. In 1772, Robert Curry settled on Mahoning Creek and was one of the first settlers in that part of Pennsylvania.

The first woolen mill in Danville was built on Mahoning Creek. An agricultural fair was held on the creek in February 1856. Phillip Maus once built a sawmill on Mahoning Creek. This sawmill contributed significantly to the construction of numerous wooden buildings in the vicinity.

Numerous bridges have been constructed over Mahoning Creek. These bridges carry Interstate 80. Three more bridges of that type were constructed in Danville in 1974.

Mahoning Creek has a watershed association, which is known as the Mahoning Creek Watershed Association. It is one of two active watershed associations in Montour County. The association has carried out watershed assessments and water quality measurements of the creek. They have also worked on a watershed restoration plan.

Biology 
Mahoning Creek is a Trout-Stocked Fishery and a Migratory Fishery from its source to the Pennsylvania Route 54 bridge. From that point to its mouth, it is a Warmwater Fishery and a Migratory Fishery. However, the tributaries Sechler Run, Mauses Creek, and Kase Run are Coldwater Fisheries and Migratory Fisheries, as are the unnamed tributaries of Mahoning Creek. Part of Mahoning Creek, its floodplain, and the nearby slopes are part of the Montour Ridge Landscape Corridor.

It is one of only two such streams in Montour County, the other being West Branch Chillisquaque Creek. In the 1820s, there were large shad, salmon and rockfish to be found in the creek's waters. These species of fish could weigh up to 7, 15, and 30 pounds (3.2, 6.8, and 13.6 kilograms), respectively.

Eight species of birds inhabit the floodplains and slopes near Mahoning Creek. These include scarlet tanagers, black-throated green warblers, belted kingfishers, gray catbirds, black-capped chickadees, eastern wood-peewees, Louisiana waterthrushes, and wood thrushes.

Mahoning Creek lacks a riparian buffer in some places. However, the Mahoning Creek floodplain and the nearby slopes are listed as a Locally Significant site on the Montour County Natural Areas Inventory. Eastern hemlock trees inhabit the slopes and river birch, silver maple, and silky dogwood inhabit the floodplain itself. American basswood also grows in the vicinity of the creek here. Additionally, spring wildflowers grow in this area. The site has a high level of plant biodiversity. However, many trees in the area are affected by an aphid species known as the hemlock wooly adelgid.

Five species of shrubs grow in the vicinity of Mahoning Creek, its floodplain, and the nearby slopes: smooth alder, silky dogwood, gray dogwood, spicebush, and American elderberry. 11 herb species also grow in this location. These include skunk cabbage, bloodroot, sensitive fern, sedge, wood anemone, woolgrass, and others. There are also invasive plants such as multiflora rose, Japanese knotweed, and garlic mustard in the area.

See also
Gaskins Run, next tributary of the Susquehanna River going downriver
Toby Run, next tributary of the Susquehanna River going upriver
List of rivers of Pennsylvania

References

External links

Tributaries of the Susquehanna River
Rivers of Pennsylvania
Rivers of Montour County, Pennsylvania
Rivers of Columbia County, Pennsylvania